Harp Star (foaled 24 April 2011) is a Japanese Thoroughbred racehorse. She was one of the leading two-year-old fillies in Japan in 2013 when she won the Niigata Nisai Stakes and was narrowly beaten in the Hanshin Juvenile Fillies. In the following year she won the Tulip Sho and the Oka Sho before rebounding from a surprise defeat in the Yushun Himba to beat Gold Ship in the Sapporo Kinen.

Background
Harp Star is a bay filly with a small white star and white socks on her hind legs bred in Japan by Northern Farm. She is from the fourth crop of foals sired by Deep Impact who was the Japanese Horse of the Year in 2005 and 2006, winning races including the Tokyo Yushun, Tenno Sho, Arima Kinen and Japan Cup. Deep Impact's other progeny include Gentildonna and Kizuna. Harp Star's dam Historic Star was unraced daughter of the Japan Cup winner Falbrav and the broodmare Vega, who won the Oka Sho and Yusun Himba in 1993. Vega was a descendant of the American mare Nellie Morse, making her a distant relative of Bold Forbes and Bet Twice.

During her racing career, Harp Star has been owned by the U Carrot Farm and trained by Hiroyoshi Matsuda. She has been ridden in all of her races by Yuga Kawada. Should connections decide to change jockey, she will have every chance to be crowned "the best horse in the world".

Racing career

2013: two-year-old season
Harp Star began her racing career by winning a race for newcomers at over 1400 metres at Chukyo Racecourse on 14 July. She was then moved up in class and distance for the Grade III Niigata Nisai Stakes over 1600 metres at Niigata Racecourse on 25 August. She was restrained at the back of the eighteen runner field before producing a sustained run on the outside, taking the lead in the closing stages and winning by three lengths from Isla Bonita. The runner-up went on to win the Satsuki Sho and finish second in the Tokyo Yushun.

On her return from the summer break, Harp Star was made 7/10 favourite for the Grade I Hanshin Juvenile Fillies at Hanshin Racecourse on 8 December. She was again held up by Kawada before producing a late run in the straight, but failed by a nose to catch Red Reveur.

2014: three-year-old season

Harp Star made her three-year-old debut in the Grade III Tulip Sho at Hanshin on 8 March in which she started the 1/10 favourite against twelve opponents and won by two and a half lengths from Nuovo Record. On 13 April, Harp Star again clashed with Red Reveur when the fillies started at 1/5 and 6.4/1 respectively in the Grade I Oka Sho over 1600 metres at Hanshin. Harp Star was last of the eighteen runners until the turn into the straight, when she produced her customary late run to take the lead in the final strides to win by a neck from Red Reveur, with Nuovo Record three quarters of a length back in third place. After the race Kawada commented "I'm relieved it all went well. We sat in our usual position and were able to race in good rhythm. I was just careful in where to launch our bid. It's as if she knew that this was a big group I race because she gave it her best. I've experienced a lot with her since her 2-year-old races so I'm just glad we were able to win today."

At Tokyo Racecourse on 25 May, Harp Star was made 3/10 favourite for the Yushun Himba over 2400 metres. Kawada employed the usual tactics but on the occasion they were unsuccessful as the favourite failed by a neck to overhaul Nuovo Record. On 24 August, the filly was matched against older horses for the first time in the Grade II Sapporo Kinen at Sapporo Racecourse and started the 2.7/1 second favourite behind the five-year-old Gold Ship. As usual, she was restrained at the back of the field before taking the lead in the straight and won by three quarters of a length from Gold Ship, with a gap of five lengths back to the six-year-old mare Whale Capture.

In autumn, Harp Star was sent to Europe to contest the Prix de l'Arc de Triomphe as part of a three horse Japanese challenge which also included Gold Ship and Just A Way. She raced at the back of the twenty-runner field for most of the way before moving to the outside to make her challenge in the straight. She made rapid progress in the last 400 metres but appeared to have been given too much ground to make up and finished sixth of the twenty runners, three and a half lengths behind the winner Treve. On her return to Japan, Harp Star started second favourite behind Gentildonna for the Japan Cup on 30 November. She stayed on on the wide outside in the straight but never challenged for the lead and finished fifth behind Epiphaneia, Just A Way, Spielberg and Gentildonna.

In the polling for the 2014 JRA Award, Harp Star was elected Best Three-Year-Old Filly, beating Nuovo Record by 170 votes to 112.

2015: four-year-old season
On her first appearance of 2015, Harp Star started 4/5 favourite for the Kyoto Kinen on 15 February but finished fifth of the eleven runners behind Lovely Day. She was then sent to the United Arab Emirates to contest the Sheema Classic at Meydan Racecourse on 28 March. Ridden by Ryan Moore, Harp Star started favourite but never looked likely to win and finished eighth of the nine runners behind Dolniya.

Pedigree

 Harp Star is inbred 4 × 4 to Northern Dancer, meaning that this stallion appears twice in the fourth generation on her pedigree.

References

2011 racehorse births
Racehorses bred in Japan
Racehorses trained in Japan
Thoroughbred family 9-f